Cultural Zionism (translit. Tsiyonut ruchanit, trans. 'Spiritual Zionism') is a strain in the concept of Zionism that valued creating a centre in historic Palestine with its own secular Jewish culture and history, including language and historical roots, rather than other Zionist ideas such as political Zionism. The man considered to have founded the concept of cultural Zionism is Asher Ginsberg, better known as Ahad Ha'am.  With his secular vision of a Jewish "spiritual center" in Israel, he confronted Theodor Herzl. Unlike Herzl, the founder of political Zionism, Ha'am strived for "a Jewish state and not merely a state of Jews".

History
Originally, Ahad Ha'am saw problems in Judaism and sought out ways to revitalize the religious community and the religion itself to regenerate interest in Judaism's adherents, especially its youth. He saw nationalism as a way to reconnect Jews to Judaism, putting forth ideas of creating settlements in Eretz Yisrael (Palestine) filled with well-versed Hebrew-speakers and a core adherence to Judaism. He saw the land of Israel and the Hebrew language as integral parts of the Jewish national heritage, and not necessarily of religious significance.

He viewed Theodor Herzl, an Austrian-Jewish journalist who was a proponent of political Zionism, as naive to suggest creating a Jewish state in any other area of the world. Neither did Ahad Ha'am trust other countries to help realize the Zionist goal of creating a Jewish state in Palestine, nor anywhere else for that matter. Ahad HaAm emphasized "Jewish self-reliance" over any other precept, as well as careful planning in infrastructure and construction of a Jewish footing in the Holy Land.

Ahad Ha'am recognized that the effort to achieve independence in the land of Israel would bring Jews into conflict with the native Arab population, as well as with the Ottomans and European colonial powers then eying the country. Instead, he proposed that the emphasis of the Zionist movement shift to efforts to revive the Hebrew language and create a new culture, free from negative diaspora influences, that would unite Jews and serve as a common denominator between diverse Jewish communities. The main goal of Ahad Ha'am's cultural Zionism was the establishment of a new spiritual center for the Jewish nation, which did not necessarily require the establishment of a Jewish state, but did require the establishment of a Jewish majority in its national home. 

The idea took hold in adherents to the school of political Zionism and became a main focus of the World Zionist Organization following its sixth congress in 1903. Following Herzl's death, Ahad Ha'am became the main leader of the WZO along with Chaim Weizmann, who energized the Zionist movement with ideas for a regeneration of the Hebrew language, establishment of Jewish settlements in Palestine, and resurrecting nationalism with Jews in the Jewish Diaspora.

The most prominent follower of this idea was Eliezer Ben-Yehuda, a linguist intent on reviving Hebrew as a spoken language among Jews (see History of the Hebrew language). Most European Jews in the 19th century spoke Yiddish, a language based on mediaeval German, but as of the 1880s, Ben Yehuda and his supporters began promoting the use and teaching of a modernised form of biblical Hebrew, which had not been a living language for nearly 2,000 years. Despite Herzl's efforts to have German proclaimed the official language of the Zionist movement, the use of Hebrew was adopted as official policy by Zionist organisations in Palestine, and served as an important unifying force among the Jewish settlers, many of whom also took new Hebrew names.

Other cultural Zionists attempted to create new Jewish art forms, including graphic arts. (Boris Schatz, a Bulgarian artist, founded the Bezalel Academy of Arts and Design in Jerusalem in 1906.) Others, such as dancer and artist Baruch Agadati, fostered popular festivals such as the Adloyada carnival on Purim.

See also 

 Cultural Judaism
 Revival of the Hebrew language
 Leon Simon

References

External links
countrystudies.us Cultural Zionism

Jewish culture
Types of Zionism